Santa Fe High School is a public secondary school located in Santa Fe, New Mexico. Founded in 1899, it is one of the oldest high schools in New Mexico. The school exclusively educates a secondary-student based body, ninth through twelfth grade.

Known for its Advanced Placement (AP) program, the school's test scores regularly outperform state, national, and global averages. The participation rate among students for AP examinations is 42% as of the 2017 academic year.

Notable graduates include Zach Condon, creator and leading member of the indie folk band Beirut, and the youngest Mayor of Santa Fe, George Abrán Gonzales, who is also the father of the former mayor, Javier Gonzales.

History 
Santa Fe High School was established in 1899 by the merchant, politician, and Governor Miguel Antonio Otero. It is the oldest of the three Santa Fe public high schools. The school was originally located downtown, one block from the Plaza in the space where City Hall and the Convention Center currently sit. The new location on a hilltop above Yucca and Siringo roads was built and opened in 1966 where students slowly transitioned until the downtown campus was officially closed in 1977.

Academics
The school is a part of U.S Department of Education's Green Ribbon Program and Sustainable Santa Fe. Santa Fe High has installed numerous solar panels that partially supply the energy of the campus.

In relation to its Advanced Placement (AP) program, Santa Fe High School's test scores regularly outperform state, national, and global averages. The participation rate among students for AP examinations is 42% as of the 2017 academic year.

Athletics
Santa Fe High School is a participating school in NM District 2-AAAAAA of the New Mexico Activities Association. The school has won over 28 state championships from NMAA sanctioned sports and events. The SFHS tennis teams (coached by math teacher Ramon Martinez) in the 1980's were particularly successful, being undefeated in dual matches (88-0) between 1979-1983. Another of the school's most dominant programs was its cross country team in the late 70s and early 80s under coach John Alire, winning twelve state title trophies during this span.

St Michael's High School is a traditional sporting rival, dating back more than 100 years.

State championships
{| class="wikitable collapsible"
|+
! colspan="2" style="text-align:center;" bgcolor=""|New Mexico State Champions
|-
! Varsity sport
! Year:
|-
|Cross country, boys' (Class AAAA)
|1974, 1975, 1976, 1978, 1979, 1980
|-
|Cross country, girls' (Class AAAA)
|1979, 1980, 1983, 1984, 1985, 1986
|-
|Volleyball (Class AAAA)
|1978, 1983, 1994
|-
|Soccer, boys'
|2021 (22-1, Class 5A)
|-
|Football 
|1979 (13-1, Class AAAA)
|-
|Basketball, boys'
|1978 (28-2, Class AAAA)
|-
|Basketball, girls' 
|1988 (20-6, Class AAAA), 2014 (30-2, Class AAAA)
|-
|Baseball
|1977 (Class AAAA)
|-
|Tennis, girls'
|1978, 1979, 1994, 1995, 1997 (tie) (Class AAAA)
|-
|Tennis, boys'
|1982, 1983 (Class AAAA)
|-
|Golf, boys'
|1976 (Class AAAA)
|-
|Golf, girls'
|1985 (Class AAAA)
|-
|Track & field, boys'
|1992 Runner-Up (Class AAAA)
|-
|Track & field, girls'
|2014 Runner-Up (Class AAAA)
|}

Notable alumni 
 Dana Tai Soon Burgess, dancer, leading Asian-American choreographer
 Zach Condon, creator and leading member of the indie folk band Beirut
 George Abrán Gonzales, Mayor of Santa Fe (1968–1972); Santa Fe High School Senior class president
 Javier Gonzales, Mayor of Santa Fe (2014-2018)
Leroy Petry, the second living person to receive the United States Armed Forces' highest decoration for valor, the Medal of Honor, for actions that occurred since the Vietnam War
Carla Garrett, (1984 Graduate) - SFHS Track, Basketball, & Soccer. U of A 10 time NCAA All-American + 3 time NCAA National Champion. Silver Medalist at World Weightlifting Championships. Olympian. 2015 NM Sports Hall of Fame. Collegiate Coach.
James Martinez, (1983 Graduate) - SFHS Basketball, Tennis. US National Rowing Team 1993-1998 + 6 time U.S. National Champion (single/double/quadruple sculls). 1996 Olympian. Multiple International Medals.

References

External links 
 
 District website

Educational institutions established in 1899
Public high schools in New Mexico
Schools in Santa Fe County, New Mexico
1899 establishments in New Mexico Territory